Björn Thors (born 12 January 1978) is an Icelandic actor. He is known for his role as Kenneth Máni in Fangavaktin, Hugo Estevez in Sjáumst með Silvíu Nótt and Darri in Katla.

Personal life 
Björn is married to actress Unnur Ösp Stefánsdóttir.

Selected filmography
Sjáumst með Silvíu Nótt (2005)
Fangavaktin (2009)
The Deep (2012)
Frost (2012)
Pressa (2012)
Paris of the North (2014)
Fangar (2017)
Woman at War (2018)
The Valhalla Murders (2019-2020)
Katla (2021) as Darri

References

External links

Living people
1978 births
Bjorn Thors
20th-century Icelandic male actors
Bjorn Thors
21st-century Icelandic male actors
Male actors from Reykjavík